Fred Dorvil (born 10 December 1995) is a Turks and Caicos Islands international footballer who plays as a forward for Provo Premier League side Beaches.

College career
Dorvil started his career with the AFC Academy of his native Turks and Caicos Islands, where he finished the 2012 Provo Premier League joint top scorer with 11 goals. However the award officially went to Samuel Narcius of Cheshire Hall as he had scored 5 additional goals in the Presidents Cup.

Dorvil moved to America and enrolled at the Western Texas College, where he joined the college's soccer team in 2013. He played 5 games for the Texan college, scoring once in a 4-0 victory over the Kansas City Kansas Community College.

After returning to his home country to play for Full Physic, where he made one appearance, Dorvil returned to America to study at Barton Community College in Kansas. In May 2016 it was announced that Dorvil would be leaving the Cougars for Faulkner University in Montgomery. Having not been able to raise enough money to pay for tuition, Dorvil returned once more to Full Physic, and made the national newspaper when he scored 9 goals in a 17-2 thrashing of fellow Provo Premier League side Teachers FC.

International career
Dorvil was called up to the Turks and Caicos Islands under 20 squad in 2014. The same year he received a call up to the senior squad, as he was selected to play in qualifying games for the 2014 Caribbean Cup. He made his debut for Turks and Caicos in a May 2014 Caribbean Cup match against Aruba.

He was also called up in 2015 for 2018 FIFA World Cup qualification. He came on as a substitute in both games, which both ended 6-2 to Saint Kitts and Nevis.

Career statistics

International

International goals
Scores and results list the Turks and Caicos Islands' goal tally first.

References

External links
 
 Profile at caribbeanfootballdatabase.com
 Profile at FIFA

1995 births
Living people
Association football midfielders
Turks and Caicos Islands footballers
Turks and Caicos Islands expatriate footballers
Turks and Caicos Islands international footballers
Expatriate soccer players in the United States
Turks and Caicos Islands expatriate sportspeople in the United States
Barton Cougars men's soccer players
Western Texas Westerners men's soccer players
Turks and Caicos Islands under-20 international footballers
AFC Academy players